Joe Knight Building, also known as Joe's Corner and Knight Drug Store, is a historic commercial building located at Lebanon, Laclede County, Missouri.  It was built in 1948, and is a three-story, Streamline Moderne brick building with a flat roof. It features horizontal bands of windows and the curved corners are accented by large curved glass block walls.  Dark bricks are also used to spell out "Joe Knight '48" and "Knight" on the main elevations.

It was listed on the National Register of Historic Places in 2005.

References

Commercial buildings on the National Register of Historic Places in Missouri
Modernist architecture in Missouri
Commercial buildings completed in 1948
Buildings and structures in Laclede County, Missouri
National Register of Historic Places in Laclede County, Missouri
1948 establishments in Missouri